Lauren Elizabeth Cox (born April 20, 1998) is an American professional basketball player who is currently playing for Valencia Basket. She played college basketball for the Baylor Lady Bears. She was named a preseason All-American by Lindy's Sports, Athlon Sports, and Street & Smith prior to the 2019 season beginning. In November 2019, ESPN ranked Cox as the second-best collegiate women's basketball player in the country behind Sabrina Ionescu. She would be named Big 12 Player of the Year that season.

Cox was diagnosed with type 1 diabetes at the age of 7. She wears an insulin pump during games. In each season of Cox's Baylor career, the Lady Bears played a preseason type 1 diabetes benefit game. The 2019 edition of the game, in Cox's final season at Baylor, was especially significant for her personally, as the opponent was defending NCAA Division II champion Lubbock Christian, which featured her younger sister Whitney—who had been diagnosed with the disease at age 17—as a freshman reserve. Near the end of the 2019–20 season, the United States Basketball Writers Association announced that both sisters would receive the Pat Summitt Most Courageous Award for their basketball and community involvement in the face of their condition.

In June, 2022, it was announced she would be joining Valencia Basket Club for 2022-2023 season of the Liga Femenina de Baloncesto.

WNBA career statistics

Regular season

|-
| align="left" | 2020
| align="left" | Indiana
| 14 || 1 || 13.1 || .419 || .500 || .733 || 3.3 || 1.4 || 0.4 || 0.3 || 0.8 || 3.6
|-
| align="left" | 2021
| align="left" | Indiana
| 11 || 0 || 8.6 || .316 || .333 || 1.000 || 2.0 || 0.3 || 0.4 || 0.3 || 0.6 || 1.4
|-
| align="left" | 2021
| align="left" | Los Angeles
| 15 || 0 || 14.0 || .413 || .200 || .778 || 3.7 || 0.6 || 0.7 || 0.9 || 0.6 || 3.5
|-
| align="left" | Career
| align="left" | 2 years, 2 teams
| 40 || 1 || 12.2 || .398 || .357 || .771 || 3.1 || 0.8 || 0.5 || 0.5 || 0.7 || 3.0

High school
Cox was one of the top-rated high school basketball players in the country. She was the 2016 Women's Basketball Coaches Association High School Player of the Year.

Career statistics

College

|-
| style="text-align:left;"|2016–17
| style="text-align:left;"|Baylor
| 37 || 1 || 13.4 || .433 || .412 || .747 || 4.1 || 1.2 || 0.4 || 1.4 || 1.1 || 7.6
|-
| style="text-align:left;"|2017–18
| style="text-align:left;"|Baylor
| 34 || 34 || 30.2 || .516 || .304 || .748 || 9.7 || 2.9 || 1.1 || 2.7 || 1.7 || 15.3
|-
| style="text-align:left;"|2018–19
| style="text-align:left;"|Baylor
| 38 || 38 || 29.5 || .522 || .306 || .734 || 8.3 || 3.7 || 0.8 || 2.6 || 1.5 || 13.0
|-
| style="text-align:left;"|2019–20*
| style="text-align:left;"|Baylor
| 22 || 22 || 30.2 || .463 || .333 || .614 || 8.4 || 3.6 || 1.3 || 2.7 || 1.6 || 12.5
|- class="sortbottom"
| style="text-align:center;" colspan="2"|Career
| 131 || 95 || 25.2 || .492 || .322 || .725 || 7.5 || 2.8 || 0.8 || 2.3 || 1.5 || 12.0

* 2020 NCAA tournament canceled due to COVID-19 pandemic

References

1998 births
Living people
All-American college women's basketball players
American women's basketball players
Basketball players from Texas
Baylor Bears women's basketball players
Centers (basketball)
Indiana Fever draft picks
Indiana Fever players
Los Angeles Sparks players
McDonald's High School All-Americans
People from Grapevine, Texas
People with type 1 diabetes
Power forwards (basketball)
Sportspeople from the Dallas–Fort Worth metroplex